Claude Antoine Marie François (1 February 1939 – 11 March 1978), also known by the nickname Cloclo, was a French pop singer, composer, songwriter, record producer, drummer and dancer. François co-wrote the lyrics of "Comme d'habitude" (composed by Jacques Revaux), the original version of "My Way" and composed the music of "Parce que je t'aime mon enfant", the original version of "My Boy". Among his other famous songs are "Le Téléphone Pleure", "Le lundi au soleil", "Magnolias for Ever" and "Alexandrie Alexandra". He also enjoyed considerable success with French-language versions of English-language songs, including "Belles! Belles! Belles!" (The Everly Brothers' "Made to Love"), "Cette année là" ("December, 1963 (Oh, What a Night)") and "Je vais à Rio" ("I Go to Rio").

François sold some 35 million records during his career (and after his death) and was about to embark for the United States when he was accidentally electrocuted in March 1978 at age 39. Former French President Valéry Giscard d'Estaing is quoted as saying Claude François was, to him, "the French equivalent of The Beatles, meaning the great talent of a generation".

Early life

The son of a French father and a Calabrian mother, Claude Antoine Marie François was born in Egypt, in the city of Ismaïlia, where his father, Aimé François (1908–1961), was working as a senior manager in the Anglo-French Suez canal company on the Suez Canal. In 1951, the job took the family to the city of Port Tewfik (now Suez Port). Claude had an older sister, Josette (born 1934), who wrote her memoirs in 2008.

François' mother, Lucia Mazzeï (1910–1992) was very musical and had her son take piano and violin lessons. On his own, the boy learned to play the drums. As a result of the 1956 Suez Crisis, the family returned to live in Monaco, 
The family's expulsion from Egypt was traumatic. They struggled financially after François' father fell ill and could not work.  Claude found a job as a bank clerk and at night earned extra money playing drums with an orchestra at the luxury hotels along the French Riviera. With a good singing voice, he was offered a chance to sing at a hotel in the fashionable Mediterranean resort town of Juan-les-Pins. Claude's show was well-received and he began to perform at the glamorous night-clubs along the Côte d'Azur.  While working in a club in 1959, he met Janet Woollacott; they wed in 1960.
Claude's father turned his back on his son when he became a musician in Monte Carlo in 1957.

Professional career and personal life

François moved to Paris, where there were many more opportunities to pursue his career. At the time, American rock and roll was taking hold in France and he took a job as part of a singing group to make a living. With the goal of eventually making it as a solo act, he paid the cost to record a 45rpm. Trying to capitalise on the American dance craze "The Twist", he recorded a song titled "Nabout Twist" that proved a resounding failure. Undaunted, in 1962 he recorded a cover version in French of an Everly Brothers song, "Made to Love", aka "Girls, Girls, Girls", under the name "Belles! Belles! Belles!".

François' career continued to blossom under a new manager. In 1963 he followed the first success with another French adaptation of an American song, this time recording "If I Had a Hammer" and "Walk Right In" in French as "Si j'avais un marteau" and "Marche Tout Droit". François met Michel Bourdais who was working for the well-known French magazine Salut les Copains ("Hi Buddies") and he asked him to draw his portrait.

On 5 April 1963, he headlined at the Paris Olympia, a sign that he had arrived. 
In 1964, he groomed 17-year-old Eurovision-winning singer, France Gall.
At the end of that year, François created original new dance steps, and Michel Bourdais drew them. For the first time, they brought up the idea of setting up a show with female dancers.

In 1967, he and Jacques Revaux wrote and composed a song in French called "Comme d'habitude" ("As Usual"), which became a hit in Francophone countries. Canadian singing star Paul Anka reworked it for the English-speaking public into the now legendary hit most famously sung by Frank Sinatra as "My Way". He sang the original version of "Parce que je t'aime, mon enfant" ("Because I Love You My Child") in 1971; it remained relatively little-known in France but Elvis Presley covered it under the title "My Boy".

Although François continued his successful formula of adapting English and American rock and roll hits for the French market, by the 1970s the market had changed and the disco craze that swept North America took root in France. This was no problem for the versatile François; he simply re-invented himself as the king of French disco, recording "La plus belle chose du monde", a French version of the Bee Gees' hit record, "Massachusetts".

Looking for new talent, he came across a singing family of two sisters and their cousins. These women became known as "Les Flêchettes" (named after "Flèche", the production label he owned) and then "Les Clodettes". He produced a couple of albums for them before his death, and they went on to sing for some of the major stars in European music. He worked non-stop, touring across Europe, Africa and at major venues in Quebec in Canada.

However, in 1971, his workload caught up with him when he collapsed on stage from exhaustion. After a brief period off, he returned to the recording studios, releasing several best-selling hits throughout the early 1970s. He expanded from owning his own record company to acquiring a celebrity magazine and a modelling agency.

Philanthropy
Although driven to achieve financial success, in 1974 he organised a concert to raise funds for a charity for handicapped children, and the following year he participated in a Paris concert to raise funds for medical research.

Personal life
In November 1960, he married with Janet Wollacoot. She had left him in 1962, and he was finally divorced from her in 1967. This failed marriage was one of the three big traumas that affected his whole life. The relationship with France Gall ended in July 1967. After this, François had an affair with singer Annie Phillippe, who reportedly refused to marry him.

François soon got consolation when he arranged a date with model Isabelle Forêt, whom he had first met a few years before. Their relationship lasted from 1967 to 1972 and produced two sons, Claude Jr. in July 1968 and Marc in November 1969. He hid the existence of his second son for five years because he thought that being a father of two would destroy his boyish image as "a free man and seducer".

By 1972 he was single again, dating several well-known European stars. Finnish model Sofia Kiukkonen 1973–76 and American model Kathalyn (Kathleen) H. Jones-Mann 1976–78 were his most important relationships of this period. He also had an affair with his dresser Sylvie Mathurin from 1974 to 1978.

He continued to perform while overseeing his numerous business interests. In 1975, while in London, he narrowly escaped death when an IRA bomb exploded in the lobby of the Hilton hotel and two years later a fan tried to shoot him while he drove his car.

In 1977–78, more than 15 years after his first hit record, he was still topping the musical charts with multi-million sales from hits such as "Alexandrie Alexandra" (which was released on the day of his burial) and performing to large audiences.

International career

He performed an international career mostly in Belgium and Switzerland, but also in Italy, Spain, England and Canada. In 1976, his song "Le Telephone Pleure" ("Tears on the Telephone") reached No. 35  in the UK Singles Chart. On 16 January 1978, he performed, for the first time for a French singer, a gala at the Royal Albert Hall in London to an audience of 6000.

Death

After working in Switzerland on 9 and 10 March and recording a television special for the BBC on Saturday, 11 March 1978, François returned to his Paris apartment, 46 Boulevard Exelmans, to appear, the next day, on Les Rendez-vous du Dimanche with TV host Michel Drucker. While taking a bath, he noticed that the light fixture was not straight on the wall; he stood up, tried to straighten it and was electrocuted.

Legacy
On 11 March 2000, the 22nd anniversary of his death, Place Claude-François in Paris was named in his memory; it is located right in front of the building where he died.

The 2003 jukebox musical Belles belles belles is based on François' songs.

A biographical film called Cloclo (My Way internationally) was released in March 2012 to coincide with the anniversary of his death. It runs two and a half hours long and stars Jérémie Renier.

Claude François's sons, Claude Jr and Marc, have assumed the management of their father's artistic heritage over the years.

Controversies
A woman named Julie Bocquet maintains that François is her father. Fabienne, her mother, was 15 when she got pregnant. Others have recently come forward as well.

Discography

Albums

2012: Génération Cloclo
2012: 30 ans – Édition aniversaire (Compilation album)

Singles
 "Nabout Twist" (Claude François)
 "Belles! Belles! Belles!" ("Made to Love", Phil Everly/Claude François/Vline Buggy)
 "Vénus en blue-jeans" ("Venus in Blue Jeans")
 "Pauvre petite fille riche" (Hubert Giraud/Claude François/Vline Buggy)
 "Si j'avais un marteau" ("If I Had a Hammer", Lee Hays/Pete Seeger/Claude François/Vline Buggy)
 "J'y pense et puis j'oublie" ("It Comes and Goes", Bill Anderson/Claude François)
 "Donna Donna" ("Dona, Dona", Sholom Secunda/Claude François/Vline Buggy)
 "Je sais" (Claude François/Gérard Gustin/Vline Buggy)
 "Quand un bateau passe" ("Trains and Boats and Planes", Burt Bacharach/Hal David/Claude François/Vline Buggy)
 "Même si tu revenais" (Bernard Kesslair/Claude François/Jacques Chaumelle)
 "Mais combien de temps" (Claude François/Vline Buggy)
 "Reviens-moi vite" (Claude François) 
 "J'attendrai" ("Reach Out I'll Be There", Holland–Dozier–Holland/Claude François/Vline Buggy)
 "Mais quand le matin" (Eric Charden/Claude François/Gilles Thibaut) 
 "Comme d'habitude" (Jacques Revaux/Claude François/Gilles Thibaut)
 "Pardon" (Jean Renard/Claude François/Gilles Thibaut)
 "Aussi loin" (Reg Guest/Claude François/Gilles Thibaut) 
 "Avec la tête, Avec le cœur" (Claude François/Jean-Pierre Bourtayre/Yves Dessca/Vline Buggy)
 "Reste" ("Beggin'", Bob Gaudio/Peggy Farina/Jacques Plante)
 "Dans les orphelinats" (Claude François/Gilles Thibaut) 
 "Un monde de musique" (Claude François/Ralph Bernet)
 "Une petite fille aux yeux rouges" (Jean-Pierre Bourtayre/Claude François/Vline Buggy)
 "Un jour ou l'autre" (Claude François/Jacques Plante)
 "Cherche" ("Show Me", Joe Tex/Claude François)
 "Mon cœur est une maison vide" (Claude François/Jean-Pierre Bourtayre/Yves Dessca/Vline Buggy)
 "Tout éclate tout explose" ("Love Explosions", George Harrison/George Kerr/Jacques Plante)
 "C'est de l'eau, c'est du vent" (Alice Dona/Pierre Delanoë)
 "Le monde est grand, les gens sont beaux" ("Beautiful World, Beautiful People", Jimmy Cliff/Eddy Marnay)
 "Si douce à mon souvenir" ("Gentle on My Mind", John Hartford/Claude François/Colette Rivat)
 "Parce que je t'aime mon enfant" (Claude François/Jean-Pierre Bourtayre/Yves Dessca)
 "C'est la même chanson" ("It's the Same Old Song", Holland–Dozier–Holland/Claude François/Colette Rivat)
 "Et pourtant le temps passe" (Claude François/Paul Sebastian/Lana Sebastian/Michaële)
 "Je vais mieux" (Claude François)
 "Bye bye petite Julie" (Claude François) 
 "Plus rien qu'une adresse en commun" (Alain Chamfort/Yves Dessca)
 "Il fait beau, il fait bon" ("Freedom Come, Freedom Go", Roger Greenaway/Roger Cook/Eddy Marnay)
 "Seule une romance" (Claude François/Eddy Marnay)
 "Y'a le printemps qui chante (Viens à la maison)" (Claude François/Jean-Pierre Bourtayre/Jean-Michel Rivat/Frank Thomas)
 "En attendant" (Claude François/Michèle Vendôme)
 "Le Lundi au soleil" (Patrick Juvet/Jean-Michel Rivat/Frank Thomas)
 "Belinda" ("Miss Belinda", Des Parton/Eddy Marnay)
 "Je viens dîner ce soir" (Paul Sebastian/Lana Sebastian/Michaële)
 "Je t'embrasse" (Claude François/Jean-Pierre Bourtayre/Yves Dessca/Jean-Michel Rivat)
 "À part ça la vie est belle" ("By the Devil I Was Tempted", Doug Flett/Guy Fletcher/ Eddy Marnay)
 "Sha la la (Hier est près de moi)" ("Yesterday Once More", Richard Carpenter/Eddy Marnay)
 "Chanson populaire" (Jean-Pierre Bourtayre/Nicolas Skorsky/Claude François)
 "Le mal aimé" ("Daydreamer", Terry Dempsey/Eddy Marnay)
 "La musique américaine" (Claude François/Jean-Pierre Bourtayre/Jean-Michel Rivat)
 "Le téléphone pleure" (Claude François /Jean-Pierre Bourtayre/Frank Thomas)
 "Toi et moi contre le monde entier" (Claude François/Jean-Pierre Bourtayre/Eddy Marnay)
 "Soudain il ne reste qu'une chanson" ("I'll Be Around", Thom Bell/Philip Hurtt/Jean-Michel Rivat)
 "Le chanteur malheureux" (Jean-Pierre Bourtayre/Martial Carceles/Jean-Michel Rivat/Michel Renard)
 "Joue quelque chose de simple" (Claude François/Jean-Pierre Bourtayre/Jean-Michel Rivat)
 "Le spectacle est terminé" (Claude François/Jean-Pierre Bourtayre/Eddy Marnay)
 "Pourquoi pleurer (sur un succès d'été)" ("Please Mr. Please", Bruce Welch/John Rostill/Frank Thomas)
 "17 ans" ("At Seventeen", Janis Ian/Frank Thomas)
 "Une chanson française" (Claude François/Jean-Pierre Bourtayre/Nicolas Skorsky)
 "Sale bonhomme" ("Nasty Dan", Jeff Moss/Eddy Marnay)
 "Dors petit homme (La chèvre grise)" (Claude François/Eddy Marnay)
 "Cette année-là" ("December, 1963 (Oh, What a Night)", Bob Gaudio/Eddy Marnay)
 "La solitude c'est après" (André Popp/Gilbert Sinoué)
 "Le vagabond" (Cyril Assous/Eddy Marnay)
 "Danse ma vie" (Claude François /Jean-Pierre Bourtayre/Pierre Delanoë)
 "Quelquefois" (duet with Martine Clemenceau) (Claude François/Jean-Pierre Bourtayre/Vline Buggy)
 "Je vais à Rio" ("I Go to Rio", Peter Allen/Eddy Marnay)
 "Les anges, les roses et la pluie" (Claude François/Jean-Pierre Bourtayre/Vline Buggy)
 "Toi et le soleil" ("I Can See Clearly Now", Johnny Nash/Eddy Marnay)
 "C'est comme ça que l'on s'est aimé" (Duet with Kathalyn Jones) (Claude François/Jean-Pierre Bourtayre/Vline Buggy)
 "Écoute ma chanson" (Toto Cutugno/Claude François/Yves Dessca)
 "Et je t'aime tellement" ("And I Love You So", Don McLean/Claude François)
 "Magnolias for Ever" (Claude François /Jean-Pierre Bourtayre/Étienne Roda-Gil)
 "Alexandrie Alexandra" (Claude François/Jean-Pierre Bourtayre/Etienne Roda-Gill)
 "Bordeaux rosé (Eddy Pumer/Peter Daltrey)

English songs
 "Go Where the Sun Is Brighter" ("Viens à la maison", English lyrics by Norman Newell) 
 "Monday Morning Again" ("Le lundi au soleil", English lyrics by Norman Newell) 
 "Love Will Call the Tune" ("Chanson populaire", English lyrics by Norman Newell) 
 "Hello Happiness" (original song by The Drifters, lyrics by Les Reed and Roger Greenaway) 
 "Tears on the Telephone" ("Le Téléphone Pleure") 
 "I Know" ("Je sais", English lyrics by Norman Newell) 
 "You Are" ("Une chanson française", English lyrics by Norman Newell) 
 "My Boy" ("Parce que je t'aime, mon enfant", English lyrics by Phil Coulter & Bill Martin)  
 "My World of Music" ("Un monde de musique", English lyrics by Norman Newell) 
 "Crying in His Heart" ("Avec le cœur, avec la tête", English lyrics by Norman Newell) 
 "My Way" ("Comme d'habitude", English lyrics by Paul Anka) 
 "I Believe in Father Christmas" (original song by Greg Lake)  
 "Stop, Stop, Stop"
 "Keep on Driving"

References

External links
 Claude Francois biography
 
 

1939 births
1978 deaths
Accidental deaths by electrocution
Accidental deaths in France
Burials in France
Egyptian emigrants to France
French disco singers
French people of Italian descent
French pop singers
French singer-songwriters
People from Ismailia Governorate
People of Calabrian descent
Philips Records artists
People from Ismailia
French people of Calabrian descent
Fontana Records artists
Phonogram Inc. artists
20th-century French male singers
French male singer-songwriters